Nikos Simigdalas (born 11 July 1942) is a Greek former professional footballer who played as a striker and a former manager. He played in one match for the Greece national football team in 1965.

Personal life
His younger brother, Michalis, was also a footballer, and they played together at Apollon Athens, while he also coached him at Ilioupoli.

Honours

Apollon Athens
Beta Ethniki: 1969–70, 1972–73 (First group)

References

External links

1942 births
Living people
Greece international footballers
Footballers from Athens
Greek footballers
Apollon Smyrnis F.C. players
Panegialios F.C. players
Association football forwards
Athinaikos F.C. managers